Mansart is a crater on Mercury. Its name was adopted by the International Astronomical Union (IAU) in 1979. Mansart is named for the French architect Jules Hardouin-Mansart, who lived from 1646 to 1708.

To the east of Mansart is Bjornson crater, and to the west is Jókai.

References

Impact craters on Mercury